Genevieve Mooy is an Australian actress. She has had a career on both stage and screen. She has appeared in stage productions such as Coral Browne - This F***ing Lady and The Appleton Ladies’ Potato Race She was a regular on the first two series of Frontline. She was nominated for the AFI Award for Best Actress in a Supporting Role in 1985 for Emoh Ruo.

References

External links
 

Living people
Australian television actresses
Australian film actresses
Australian stage actresses
Year of birth missing (living people)